Pillars Stadium established in 1949 is a multi-purpose stadium in the Sabon Gari area Kano, Kano State, Nigeria. Its location is at the intersection of Abuja Road and Airport Road. It is currently used mostly for football matches and it is one of the two stadiums used by Kano Pillars FC, with the other being Sani Abacha Stadium. The stadium has a capacity of 10,000. 
In 2014 it became the temporary home of El-Kanemi Warriors after their home of Maiduguri was deemed unsafe for matches.

References

Football venues in Nigeria
Buildings and structures in Kano

2. New Nigeria Newspaper 5th February 1972